Saint-Sauveur-la-Vallée (Languedocien: Sent Salvador) is a former commune in the Lot department in south-western France. On 1 January 2016, it was merged into the new commune of Cœur de Causse. Its population was 52 in 2019.

See also
Communes of the Lot department

References

Saintsauveurlavallee